Alice Miller (born March 22, 1939) is an American politician in the state of Vermont. She is a member of the Vermont House of Representatives, sitting as a Democrat from the Bennington-3 district, having been first elected in 1996.

References

1939 births
Living people
People from Shaftsbury, Vermont
Democratic Party members of the Vermont House of Representatives
Women state legislators in Vermont
21st-century American politicians
21st-century American women politicians